The Baku Cup was a professional women's tennis tournament held in Baku, Azerbaijan. It made its debut on the 2011 WTA Tour and as one of the international tier of events. This WTA Tour event is an international tournament and was played at the Baku Tennis Academy on outdoor hardcourts.
The 2015 Baku Cup was the last edition.

History
Baku Cup is the first WTA event to be held in the city. It became the first professional tennis tournament hosted by the country, with the inaugural event beginning on 18 July 2011.  The event offered $220,000 in prize money and was played on outdoor hard courts with a field of 32 singles players and 16 doubles teams.

Results

Singles

Doubles

References

External links
 Official website 
 WTA Tour calendar

 
Tennis tournaments in Azerbaijan
Hard court tennis tournaments
WTA Tour
Sports competitions in Baku
Recurring sporting events established in 2011
Recurring sporting events disestablished in 2015